Sergio Rossi is an Italian fashion brand that focuses on footwear. Founded in Italy in 1951, the brand was later acquired by the Gucci Group in 1999. It became a part of the Kering Group under François Pinault, from 2005 until 2016, when Investindustrial fully acquired the brand. In June 2021, Fosun Fashion Group (FFG) announced that it had come to an agreement to acquire Sergio Rossi. The ownership was transferred to the Lanvin Group in October 2021.

History 

Founded in 1951 in San Mauro Pascoli, the brand takes its name from founder Sergio Rossi, who inherited the tools and traditions of shoemaking from his father. At first, Rossi worked through the winter making sandals that he would later sell on the beaches of Rimini and in boutiques in Bologna. One such model, the Opanca, became very popular; it was a simple design in which the sole curved gently around the foot, forming a whole with the upper part of the shoe. In 1968, the first official collection of Sergio Rossi brand shoes were produced. According to Vogue, during the 1960s the company "rapidly became synonymous with Italian quality and classic feminine designs."

Business development 
Sergio Rossi shoes became famous for their particular use of geometric patterns and color. The brand became popular in the 1970s due to collaborations with well-known designers, including Dolce & Gabbana, Versace, and Azzedine Alaïa. In 1980, the expansion process began in Italy and abroad, with the opening of the first single-brand boutiques in Ancona and then later in Turin, Florence, Rome, Brussels, New York, Los Angeles, and London. In 1999, the PPR Luxury Division, known as Gucci Group, acquired 70% of shares of Sergio Rossi for a value of approximately 96 million dollars. Six years later, the Kering group bought the remaining 30%, obtaining full control of the Sergio Rossi brand. In 2015, the company was sold to Investindustrial holdings. Riccardo Sciutto was appointed CEO with the aim of restoring the historic footwear brand to its authentic self. In June 2021, Fosun Fashion Group (FFG) announced that it had signed an agreement to acquire 100% of Sergio Rossi S.p.A.

Design and Know-how 
Sergio Rossi considered shoemaking a continuous reflection on form, harmony and elegance; these main principles still guide the brand and are expressed in the handmade creations made by skilled craftsmen. A pair of Sergio Rossi shoes requires a minimum of 120 different processes to be completed.

San Mauro production plant 
The San Mauro production plant was built in 2003. San Mauro's industrial platform develops, industrializes and produces all types of women and men's luxury footwear, from flat styles to high heels. The San Mauro plant produces shoes for Sergio Rossi, Amina Muaddi, and other brands.

Sustainability 
Sergio Rossi sets sustainability goals that are established in accordance with the United Nations Global Compact (UNGC) Initiative. In 2020, 100% of all electricity used for the brand's factory, offices, and shops was produced from renewable sources. However, Good on You, a sustainability rating service, rated the company "not good enough," stating that Sergio Rossi, "does not use eco-friendly materials" and that "there is no evidence it implements water reduction initiatives. It uses renewable energy in its direct operations to reduce its climate impact but not its supply chain.

Testimonials 
Sergio Rossi shoes have always been very popular on the red carpet and many celebrities have worn them, including Eva Longoria, Sharon Stone, Diane Kruger, Ludivine Sagnier, Anne Hathaway, Karolína Kurková, Amanda Seyfried, Rosie Huntington-Whiteley, Naomi Campbell, Sarah Jessica Parker, Vanessa Hudgens, Halle Barry, Eva Herzigová, Cate Blanchett, Naomi Watts, Nicole Kidman, Lupita Nyong'o, Emmy Rossum, Priyanka Chopra, Lady Gaga, Rihanna, Nazha, Lizzo, Rita Ora and Janice Man.

Sergio Rossi's shoes have been featured in the following works:

 Anita Ekberg wears a pair in Federico Fellini's La Dolce Vita, 1959
 Beyoncé wears a pair of gladiator boots in her 2011 music video "Run the World (Girls)"
 Silvana Mangano wears a pair in the film Gruppo di famiglia in un interno by Luchino Visconti, 1974
 Pedro Almodóvar's High Heels movie poster shows a pair of Sergio Rossi shoes
 The Cachet model is worn by Madonna in her video clip "Give Me All Your Luvin'"
 Blair Waldorf wears a pair in the Gossip Girl TV series

Campaigns 
Sergio Rossi's early advertising campaigns were inspired by the work of Helmut Newton, using low-angled shots to highlight the length of the legs and body, and focusing on the height and shape of the heel. In 2011, the company opened a shop dedicated to men's shoes in Milan in collaboration with Wallpaper* magazine, designed by architect Antonino Cardillo. In 2012, the company released a short-film, Skin to Skin, in collaboration with director Luca Guadagnino.

References

External links 
 Official website

Luxury brands
Clothing companies established in 1951
High fashion brands
Italian companies established in 1951
Clothing brands of Italy
Shoe companies of Italy
Shoe brands
Leather manufacturers
Fashion accessory brands
Bags (fashion)
Companies based in the Province of Forlì-Cesena